The Falcon's Alibi is a 1946 American mystery film directed by Ray McCarey and starring Tom Conway, Rita Corday and Vince Barnett. It was the ninth film featuring Conway as The Falcon. After the following film, The Falcon's Adventure, the series was ended due to declining popularity.

Plot
After attending a birthday party for the wealthy Gloria Peabody, The Falcon is employed by her secretary to find some missing jewels which she fears she will be blamed for. Before long, a man is murdered, bringing unwelcome police involvement in the case.

Cast
 Tom Conway as Tom Lawrence  
 Rita Corday as Joan Meredith  
 Vince Barnett as Goldie Locke  
 Jane Greer as Lola Carpenter  
 Elisha Cook Jr. as Nick 
 Emory Parnell as Metcalf  
 Al Bridge as Police Inspector Blake  
 Esther Howard as Gloria Peabody  
 Jean Brooks as Baroness Lena  
 Paul Brooks as Alex Olmsted  
 Jason Robards Sr. as Harvey Beaumont  
 Morgan Wallace as Bender 
 Lucien Prival as Baron

References

Bibliography
Mayer, Geoff. Historical Dictionary of Crime Films. Scarecrow Press, 2012.

External links
 
 
 
 

1946 films
American mystery films
American black-and-white films
1946 mystery films
Films scored by Ernest Gold
Films directed by Ray McCarey
RKO Pictures films
The Falcon (film character) films
1940s English-language films
1940s American films